The Ministry of Digital Development, Innovation and Aerospace Industry is a central executive body of the Government of Kazakhstan. It was established as the Ministry of Defense and Aerospace Industry on 6 October 2016 by a presidential decree. The Ministry is responsible for the implementation of state policy in the field of defense, aerospace and electronic industries, information security in the field of cybersecurity, mobilization training and mobilization, the formation and development of the state material reserve, participation in a unified military-technical policy and military-technical cooperation, leadership in the formation, placement and implementation of the defense order.

On 25 February 2019, by a decree of the President of Kazakhstan, the Ministry of Defense and Aerospace Industry was reorganized into the Ministry of Digital Development, Defense and Aerospace Industry. All functions and powers in the field of communications, information, “electronic government”, and the development of state policy in the provision of public services was transferred from the Ministry of Information and Communications of the Republic of Kazakhstan.

On 17 June 2019, by the decree of the President of Kazakhstan, the functions and powers of the Ministry in the field of defense industry, participation in a unified military-technical policy, military-technical cooperation, the formation, placement and implementation of the state defense order were transferred to the Ministry of Industry and Infrastructure Development. In the field of mobilization training and mobilization, the formation and development of the state material reserve to the Ministry of National Economy, while the remaining functions of the Ministry itself was transformed into the Ministry of Digital Development, Innovation and Aerospace Industry.

The purpose of the department is to achieve and maintain the level of security of electronic information resources, information systems and information and communication infrastructure from external and internal threats, ensuring sustainable development of the Republic of Kazakhstan in the context of global competition.

References

2016 establishments in Kazakhstan
Digital
Ministries established in 2016